The 1915 Rice Owls football team was an American football team that represented Rice University as a member of the Southwest Conference (SWC) during the 1915 college football season. In its fourth season under head coach Philip Arbuckle, the team compiled a 5–3 record (1–2 against SWC opponents) and was outscored by a total of 143 to 122.

Schedule

References

Rice
Rice Owls football seasons
Rice Owls football